Kahriz (also Romanized as Kahrīz; also known as Kahrīz-e Khān Bābā Khān and Kārīz) is a village in Babarashani Rural District, Chang Almas District, Bijar County, Kurdistan Province, Iran. At the 2006 census, its population was 312, in 61 families. The village is populated by Kurds with a Azerbaijani minority.

References 

Towns and villages in Bijar County
Kurdish settlements in Kurdistan Province
Azerbaijani settlements in Kurdistan Province